"All That I Can Say" is a song by American recording artist Mary J. Blige. It was composed by fellow R&B singer and close friend Lauryn Hill, who also sang backing vocals, for Blige's fourth studio album Mary (1999). Released as the album's lead single, it became a moderate commercial success in both the United States and United Kingdom, peaking at numbers forty-four and twenty-nine, respectively.

Blige garnered her sixth Grammy Award nomination for Best Female R&B Vocal Performance at the 42nd Grammy Awards. Blige performed the song live in addition to an impromptu appearance by Hill who performed a rap on the first incarnation of The Queen Latifah Show in September 1999. She also performed the song on Top of the Pops, and her performance was shown the week "All That I Can Say" charted.

Critical reception
Larry Flick from Billboard wrote that the song "demonstrates yet another formidable step forward in the career path of this fly girl gone sophisticate." He noted that Blige is "in good hands with this dreamy, '70s-based jazz/funk smash", and that she is "sounding as sharp as cut glass, with a smattering of scatting and just enough grit to define the artist's signature edge in this classy number." He also described the track as "spirited, joyful, retro, and yet right on the edge, sounding like nothing she's delivered before". The Daily Vault's Mark Millan stated that "All That I Can Say" "gets things off to a good start, and Blige's voice has never sounded as softly sweet as it is here". Stacey A. Rather from Lincolnian said the song has a "pop sound that is very prevalent in music right now." 

Stevie Chick from NME called it a "perfect, loving pastiche of Wonder's Moog-powered balladry." He added, "It is, tellingly, written, arranged and produced by Lauryn herself. Standing head and shoulders above the rest of the LP, it almost cruelly reveals the distance between Hill, and this pretender to her throne." Another editor, John Robinson wrote, "'All That I Can Say' is glorious, as if straight out of the '70s soul/funk golden age. Those searching synths could've been stripped straight from Stevie Wonder's 'Fulfillingness' First Finale' album, that melody embodies not a little of Al Green's sexy, laid-back magic. And Mary J's vocals eschew the modern, octave-skipping histrionics of Mariah et al, in favour of a more reserved delivery, building up to an angelic crescendo on the run-out groove that may be the most perfect 30 seconds or so of music recorded this year." "'All That I Can Say' is also as sublime a listening experience as you're likely to hear all year, written, produced, performed to perfection, and guaranteed to coat you head to toe in goose pimples in under four minutes flat. Shameless, yeah. But as in shamelessly good."

Music video
The accompanying music video of "All That I Can Say" begins with Blige lying asleep in her bed. It's morning over New York City. A white horse runs through the streets. Her alarm clock wakes Blige up at 9.00 a.m.. Sitting up in bed, she begins to sing, before walking to the window where she looks at the white clouds over the city. In the next scene, the singer is seen walking in the middle of a street in front of the Grand Central Station, while it is raining confetti from the sky. Large billboards in the city are showing press photos of Blige and a large moving red text line says, "New York Loves You Mary ..." Standing, looking at this, many red bubbles suddenly appear around her. Inside each of them we see Blige in another dress. In the last part of the video, she stands in the middle of a giant escalator up from the city to the sky. Then the singer walks on the clouds, apparently on her way to meet a young black man, who is standing naked on the clouds a little further away. Suddenly the alarm clock interrupts after it has just turned 9.00 a.m.. Blige wakes up and sits up in bed with a puzzled face, as she looks out at the clouds outside the window as the video ends. 

The music video was later published on Blige's official YouTube channel in June 2009. It has amassed more than 4,2 million views as of September 2021.

Track listings
UK CD single

Notes
  denotes additional producer

Charts

Weekly charts

Year-end charts

Release history

Cover versions 
In 2000, French pianist Alex Bugnon covered the song from his album As Promised, which featured a guest vocals from Blige's former MCA Records signee Christopher Williams.

In 2011, jazz vocalist Gretchen Parlato covered the song on her album The Lost and Found.

References

1999 singles
Mary J. Blige songs
Song recordings produced by Lauryn Hill
Songs written by Lauryn Hill
1999 songs
MCA Records singles